Freirina is a Chilean commune and town in Huasco Province, Atacama Region.

Demographics
According to the 2002 census by the National Statistics Institute, Freirina had 5,666 inhabitants; of these, 3,469 (61.2%) lived in urban areas and 2,107 (38.8%) in rural areas. At that time, there were 2,800 men and 2,866 women. The population grew by 8.5% (445 persons) between the 1992 and 2002 censuses.

Administration
As a commune, Freirina is a third-level administrative division of Chile administered by a municipal council, headed by an alcalde who is directly elected every four years. The 2008-2012 alcalde is Roberto Bruzzone Galeb.

Within the electoral divisions of Chile, Freirina is represented in the Chamber of Deputies by Mr. Alberto Robles (PRSD) and Mr. Giovanni Calderón  (UDI) as part of the 6th electoral district, (together with Caldera, Tierra Amarilla, Vallenar, Huasco and Alto del Carmen). The commune is represented in the Senate by Isabel Allende Bussi (PS) and Baldo Prokurica Prokurica (RN) as part of the 3rd senatorial constituency (Atacama Region).

References

Communes of Chile
Populated places in Huasco Province
Atacama Desert